Vilvaarani is a panchayat village located in Tiruvannamalai district of Tamil Nadu, India.

See also
 Tiruvannamalai

References

Cities and towns in Tiruvannamalai district